Woody Lee (born April 1, 1968 in Garland, Texas) is an American country music singer and songwriter. Signed to Atlantic Records in 1995, he released his debut album Get Over It that year. It produced the double-sided single "Get Over It"/"I Like the Sound of That." Before the release of his album, he co-wrote "I See It Now" for fellow labelmate Tracy Lawrence. He also wrote Shenandoah's 1995 single "Always Have, Always Will".

Discography

Albums

Singles

Music videos

Get Over It

Track listing
"I Can Do That" (Jerry Salley, Marvin Morrow) – 2:50
"Get Over It" (Keith Follese, Stephanie Bentley, Adrienne Follese) – 3:33
"I Like the Sound of That" (Steve Seskin, Andre Pessis) – 3:58
"Prove My Love" (Woody Lee, Larry Boone, Paul Nelson) – 3:43
"Lonely Needin' Lovin'" (Buddy Brock, Kenny Chesney, Donny Kees) – 3:18
"Salt and Water" (Jerry Vandiver) – 2:57
"I'm on Your Side" (Johnny MacRae, Steve Clark) – 3:47
"King of Pain" (Randy Boudreaux, Kim Williams, Tracy Lawrence) – 3:10
duet with Tracy Lawrence
"Hold It Right There" (Michael Huffman, Gene Dobbins, Bob Morrison) – 2:48
"Life in the Slow Lane" (Jess Leary, Jody Alan Sweet) – 2:48

Chart Singles written by Woody Lee

The following is a list of Woody Lee compositions that were chart hits.

References

1968 births
American country singer-songwriters
American male singer-songwriters
Atlantic Records artists
Living people
Singer-songwriters from Texas
People from Garland, Texas
Country musicians from Texas